Scope (previously known as the National Spastics Society) is a disability charity in England and Wales that campaigns to change negative attitudes about disability, provides direct services, and educates the public. The organisation was founded in 1952 by a group of parents and social workers who wanted to ensure that their disabled children had the right to a decent education. Originally focused on cerebral palsy, Scope now embraces all conditions and impairment. Scope subscribes to the social model of disability rather than the medical model of disability – that a person is disabled by the barriers placed in front of them by society, not because of their condition or impairment.

History
Scope was founded as the National Spastics Society on 9 October 1951 by Ian Dawson-Shepherd, Eric Hodgson, Alex Moira and a social worker, Jean Garwood, with the aim of improving and expanding services for people with cerebral palsy.

From 1955 to 1989, the society ran the Thomas Delarue School, a specialist secondary boarding school at Tonbridge, Kent. Scope ran several other schools until they were transferred to another organization in 2018.

Over time, thanks in large part to the influence of Bill Hargreaves, the first trustee with cerebral palsy, the charity's aims extended to improving and expanding services for people with cerebral palsy and disabled people in general. Bill's pioneering work in employment in the 1950s supported over 1,500 disabled people into their first jobs. In 1962, he set up the 62 Clubs where disabled people could choose and control their own leisure activities. Through its employment services, Scope continues to support disabled people to have the same opportunities as everyone else.

In 1963, the organisation merged with the British Council for the Welfare of Spastics to become The Spastics Society. The Spastics Society provided sheltered workshops and day centres for people with cerebral palsy (commonly referred to as spastics at the time, despite spasticity being a symptom of only one variant of cerebral palsy), who were seen as being unemployable in mainstream society. The Society provided residential units and schools, as well as opening a chain of charity shops.

The term spastic had long been used as a general playground insult, so in 1994 the organisation changed its name to Scope.
 
In November 1996, Scope AGM voted in favour of an individual membership scheme to give a voice to the 20,000 people that Scope and its local groups are in contact with every year – the first major UK disability charity to do so. In 1998, Scope individual members voted in elections to Executive Council.

In 2017, Scope launched its new strategy – Everyday equality – which set out how the charity would campaign to support disabled people. The strategy sets out an ambition to offer information, support and advice to two million disabled people and their families every year.

In 2018 Scope transferred 51 services, 31 care homes, 10 day services, and 1,300 staff to Salutem Healthcare as part of a major shift out of service provision.

Campaigns

In 2004 Scope launched the Time to Get Equal campaign to reduce disablism, which it defines as "discriminatory, oppressive or abusive behaviour arising from the belief that disabled people are inferior to others".

In 2014 Scope ran a campaign called End The Awkward fronted by comedian Alex Brooker. The campaign used comedy to shine a light on the awkwardness that many people feel about disability. Scope's End The Awkward campaign continued in 2015 when they teamed up with Channel 4 to run a series of short films entitled What Not to Do, which demonstrated how not to behave in situations including a blind date, a job interview and at the hairdressers. Scope also created an A-Z of sex and disability.

In 2016 Scope launched their third year of End The Awkward where they introduced their H.I.D.E. concept — a mnemonic which stands for: Say 'Hi'; Introduce yourself; Don't panic; End the awkward — to encourage people to talk to disabled people rather than avoid them.

In 2017 Scope partnered with Virgin Media to run their Work With Me and Support To Work efforts, providing online advice and support for disabled people seeking work.

Publications 
N.S.S. news : the monthly magazine of the National Spastics Society, ran from 1953-1958 and became:

Spastics news : magazine of the National Spastics Society, ran from 1958-1984 and became:

Disability now, ran from 1984-2012 (ceased publication).

References

External links
 

Charities based in London
Charities for disabled people based in the United Kingdom
Cerebral palsy organizations
Disability rights organizations
Health in the London Borough of Newham
Organisations based in the London Borough of Newham
Organizations established in 1951
1951 establishments in England